Phelsuma lineata, the lined day gecko, is a species of diurnal gecko native to Madagascar. It has also been introduced to Réunion.

This species as described appears to be a conglomeration of many distinct forms; three of these are currently recognized subspecies (ssp. lineata, ssp. bombetokensis, and ssp. punctulata), but others could be separate taxa that should be elevated to species status as was Phelsuma dorsivittata. Phelsuma lineata is not threatened, but some unknown subspecies might be.

Description
The lined day gecko commonly measures between 4-6″ (10-15 cm) in length. Males are more colorful than females, having a medium-green base color, red splotches on the lower back and head, and a brown to black lateral band on each side. The tail may be blue. The underside is pale.

Distribution and Habitat
The lined day gecko prefers to reside in humid subtropical climatic zones along northern and eastern parts of Madagascar. The lined day gecko and its subspecies can be found in both mid- and low- elevated sites along the east coast of the island.

References

Phelsuma
Endemic fauna of Madagascar
Reptiles of Madagascar
Taxa named by John Edward Gray
Reptiles described in 1842